John Leslie Pelphrey (born July 18, 1968) is an American college basketball coach, currently the head coach of the Tennessee Tech Golden Eagles. After being named Kentucky Mr. Basketball in 1987, he became a star college player at the University of Kentucky.

After his playing career ended, Pelphrey became as an assistant coach under Eddie Sutton at Oklahoma State University. He was then hired to serve under Billy Donovan at Marshall University and followed him to Florida. Pelphrey took his first head coaching job in 2002, when he was hired by the University of South Alabama, and in 2007 he was chosen to take the head coaching position at the University of Arkansas. After leaving Arkansas, he returned to Florida.

Playing career

Early years

John Pelphrey was born in Paintsville, Kentucky.  He attended Paintsville High School, where he was coached by Bill Mike Runyon. He would lead the Tigers to the Sweet Sixteen in the State Tournament, and make the Sweet Sixteen Fab 50. During his senior year as a Tiger (1987), the team's final record was 32–5. The team won Paintsville Invitational Championship, the Hillbrook Classic, the 57th District Championship, the 15th Region Championship, and made the KHSAA "Sweet Sixteen" Final Four where they lost to eventual state runner-up Louisville Ballard led by future NBA player Allan Houston. A two-sport athlete, Pelphrey also had a passion for baseball, he played during his high school years as a shortstop and a pitcher.

College

While a player at Kentucky from 1988 to 1992, Pelphrey led the Wildcats to the SEC Tournament Championship and an NCAA Tournament appearance, including the epic battle with Duke in the 1992 Elite Eight. Pelphrey was a two-time captain while at Kentucky and in 1989 was named the UK Student Athlete of the Year.  During his collegiate career, Pelphrey started 90 of 114 games, and averaged 11 points per game over his career.  In 2005, Pelphrey was inducted into the Kentucky Hall of Fame.

During his freshman year in 1988–89, the UK program was rocked by a major scandal. One player, Eric Manuel, was found by the NCAA to have received improper assistance on his college entrance exams. A second player, Chris Mills, received cash payments from a booster. The scandal led to the resignation of coach Eddie Sutton and athletic director Cliff Hagan, and led to major NCAA sanctions. Pelphrey and his fellow freshmen, Richie Farmer, Deron Feldhaus and Sean Woods, stayed with the program despite the sanctions, and entered UK lore during their senior season in 1991–92.

That year, a relatively unheralded Kentucky team coached by Rick Pitino, in its first year after coming off NCAA probation, advanced all the way to the Elite Eight, losing to Duke in the East Regional title game. This game is often considered one of the greatest in college basketball history, ending with the Blue Devils' Christian Laettner's buzzer-beating jumper in overtime, which is among the most famous finishes in a college basketball game. John was the player who was supposed to be guarding him when he made the buzzer beater. Pelphrey and the other three seniors, as undisputed team leaders who showed their loyalty to UK during some of the program's darkest hours, would forever be known by Wildcats fans as "The Unforgettables" (A name given to them by Coach Pitino).  Pelphrey is one of 36 former Kentucky players to have his jersey retired (#34).

Coaching career

Oklahoma State
After leaving Kentucky, Pelphrey failed to get drafted in the NBA and spent a short time playing professional basketball in France and Spain before joining his former coach Eddie Sutton's staff at Oklahoma State for the 1993–94 season.

Marshall
Pelphrey joined Billy Donovan's staff at Marshall for two years and was instrumental in the resurgence of the Thundering Herd program.

Florida
In 1996, he followed Donovan from Marshall to Florida and coached as an assistant for 6 years. He helped the Gators garner a school record four straight NCAA Tournament appearances from 1999 to 2002. During the 1999–2000 season, the Gators made their first-ever appearance in the national championship game against Michigan State.

South Alabama
Pelphrey spent five seasons as head coach at the University of South Alabama, starting in 2002. In his first season there in 2002–03, Pelphrey led the Jaguars to a 14–14 record but had subsequently bad seasons the next two years, going 12–16 in 2003-04 and then 10–18 in 2004–05. In 2005-06 the Jaguars defeated Western Kentucky University in the Sun Belt Conference tournament championship game, earning USA's first NCAA tournament bid since 1998. The Jaguars lost to eventual tournament champions, Florida in the round of 64.

In 2007, Pelphrey led the Jags to a regular season title but they fell short in the Sun Belt Conference tournament quarterfinals after losing the final four games of the regular season. This led to an NIT berth and resulted in a loss to Syracuse in the first round 79–73, which was South Alabama's sixth straight loss to end the season. South Alabama finished the year with a 20–12 record, giving Pelphrey an overall record of 80–67 with the Jags.

Arkansas
Pelphrey was announced as the new head coach of the University of Arkansas basketball team at a press conference on Monday, April 9, 2007, in Fayetteville, Arkansas. Pelphrey replaced Stan Heath, whose tenure ended with the University of Arkansas on March 26, 2007.
The Razorbacks began the season ranked # 19, but fell out of the top 25 after losing their third game of the season to unranked Providence. Arkansas went on to win six consecutive games to improve to 8–1, before losing to the Oklahoma Sooners. They finished the nonconference season 11–3, highlighted by wins over Missouri and Baylor.

The Hogs won their first two conference games against Auburn and Alabama, before losing their next two to South Carolina and Georgia. Pelphrey's Razorback team then responded with back-to-back home wins against two ranked opponents, defeating Mississippi State and also Florida, coached by one of his mentors and dear friend, Billy Donovan. The Razorbacks also handed a loss to ranked Vanderbilt along the way. Arkansas finished the SEC regular season with a 9–7 record.

The Hogs defeated Vanderbilt (then ranked 18th nationally) again in the 2008 SEC tournament. They followed this up with arguably their biggest victory of the season, a 92–91 win over #4 Tennessee in the tourney semifinals.  The Hogs lost in the championship game to underdog Georgia, but rebounded to defeat Indiana 86–72 in the opening round of the NCAA Tournament. It was the Razorbacks' first NCAA tourney victory since 1999. The Razorbacks were eliminated by overall #1 seed North Carolina in the second round.

On December 30, 2008, Pelphrey earned his biggest upset as coach of the Razorbacks up until that point by beating #4 ranked Oklahoma in Bud Walton Arena, 96–88.  On January 6, 2009, Pelphrey followed that victory up with a huge win over one of Arkansas' archrivals from its Southwest Conference days, the #7 ranked Texas Longhorns, 67–61.  However, after those wins, Pelphrey's season rapidly went downhill as the Razorbacks went on to a last place finish in the SEC West with a 2–14 record and an overall final record of 14–16.

In the 2009–10 season, Pelphrey's team started off slow, losing to Morgan State, East Tennessee State and South Alabama early in non-conference play. But Arkansas regained some momentum by winning five in a row to have a 7–5 record, although the victories came against Mississippi Valley State, Delaware State, Alabama State, Stephen F. Austin and Missouri State. The Razorbacks then lost four straight, including the Southeastern Conference opener against Mississippi State. Arkansas was humbled in a 101–70 loss at Kentucky but followed with five straight SEC wins to improve to 13–11. However, the Razorbacks finished the season on another slide, losing their final five games of the regular season before falling to Georgia in the first round of the SEC Tournament by a score of 77–64 to end with a six-game losing streak. The six-game slide is the longest in the history of University of Arkansas basketball to end a season with and dropped the Razorbacks to 14–18.

His fourth season saw an improvement in the overall record, getting to 18–13, but the team was unable to secure any invitation to postseason play.

Despite having signed a highly regarded recruiting class, on March 13, 2011, Pelphrey was fired as head coach at the University of Arkansas. He said he felt that the university did not give him enough time to complete a turnaround of the program. His record after four seasons with the Razorbacks was 69–59.

Florida, second stint

On April 12, 2011, Pelphrey was re-hired by his former boss Billy Donovan to be an assistant at Florida.

He was not retained by new Florida coach Michael White following Donovan's departure in 2015. During the 2015-16 season, he worked as an analyst on the SEC Network.

Alabama

Avery Johnson announced on April 7, 2016, that he had hired Pelphrey to his staff at Alabama.

Tennessee Tech

Pelphrey was announced as the program's 13th head coach on April 6, 2019.

Personal life
Pelphrey and his wife Tracy Lyon have two living children: a son, Jaxson, and a daughter, Grace Donovan. In 2003, the Pelphreys' infant son, John Patrick, died of a rare blood disorder. On June 10, 2008, Pelphrey and his wife launched the Pel's Pals Foundation as a memorial to John Patrick.

His brother, Jerry, was a player and assistant coach for the East Tennessee State men's Basketball team.

He also has a sister Jacqui Pelphrey (daughter Mary Kate Arbuckle)

Head coaching record

Awards

Player

Coaching
2006 Sun Belt Conference Coach of the Year

References

External links
 Career UK Stats

1968 births
Living people
Alabama Crimson Tide men's basketball coaches
American expatriate basketball people in France
American expatriate basketball people in Spain
American men's basketball coaches
American men's basketball players
Arkansas Razorbacks men's basketball coaches
Basketball coaches from Kentucky
Basketball players from Kentucky
College men's basketball head coaches in the United States
Florida Gators men's basketball coaches
Kentucky Wildcats men's basketball players
Liga ACB players
Marshall Thundering Herd men's basketball coaches
Paintsville High School alumni
People from Paintsville, Kentucky
Shooting guards
Small forwards
South Alabama Jaguars men's basketball coaches
Tennessee Tech Golden Eagles men's basketball coaches